Auxolophotis ioxanthias is a moth in the family Crambidae. It was described by Edward Meyrick in 1933. It is found on Fiji.

References

Moths described in 1933
Pyraustinae
Moths of Fiji
Taxa named by Edward Meyrick